Kibor is a surname of Kenyan origin that may refer to:

Joan Kibor (born 1989), Kenyan volleyball player
Joseph Kibor (born 1972), Kenyan cross country runner
Willy Kibor Koitile (born 1986), Kenyan marathon runner and winner of the 2011 Shanghai Marathon

See also
Felix Kibore (born 1988), Kenya-Qatari long-distance runner
Kyiv Interbank Offer Rate, known under the acronym KIBOR

Kalenjin names